Niedergörsdorf is a municipality in the Teltow-Fläming district of Brandenburg, Germany.

Demography

Photo gallery

See also
Dennewitz

References

Localities in Teltow-Fläming
Fläming Heath